Park Soo-young is a South Korean actor. He is known for his roles in dramas such as My Beautiful Bride (2015), Listen to Love (2016), Hi Bye, Mama! (2020) and Record Of Youth (2020).

Filmography

Television series

Film

Awards and nominations
 2006 Theatrical Association Awards
 2006 Men's Acting Awards
 2007 Theatrical Awards Expected Theater Awards

References

External links 
 
 

1970 births
Living people
21st-century South Korean male actors
South Korean male film actors
South Korean male television actors